Peter Lange is an American academic and the former Provost of Duke University, serving three terms from 1999 to 2014. As Provost, Lange oversaw the creation of Duke Kunshan University in China, and two five-year strategic plans. His tenure included building interdisciplinary institutes and new library and arts facilities. Lange was the university's longest-serving provost, and also served as a professor of political science.

Lange resigned in 2014, and was succeeded by Sally Kornbluth.

References 

Oberlin College alumni
Duke University faculty
Duke University people
Living people
Massachusetts Institute of Technology alumni
Year of birth missing (living people)